Joshuah Vaz (born 5 August 1990) is an Indian former professional footballer who played as a midfielder. He is also a futsal player and currently the futsal head coach of Mohammedan SC.

Club career
Born in Goa, Vaz began his career in the youth ranks of Dempo. He participated with the club's first-team in the Goa Professional League before getting called into the side's I-League squad in 2008. In September 2007 it was reported that Vaz would be sent to Portuguese club Vitória Guimarães for training. Vaz stayed with the club until 2010 before moving to local division side Salcete. After spending some time with Salcete, Vaz joined Churchill Brothers where he spent a season before moving back to local football with Goa Velha.

After playing a couple of seasons with Goa Velha, Vaz joined Goan second division side Panjim Footballers in order to gain match fitness after an injury. He spent one season with Panjim before moving to Goa Pro League side Santa Cruz Club of Cavellosim.

Prior to the 2016–17 I-League season, Vaz rejoined Churchill Brothers. He would go on to make his professional debut in the league the next season on 10 December 2017 against Mohun Bagan. He started and played 70 minutes as Churchill Brothers were defeated 5–0.

At the end of the 2017–18 season, Vaz left Churchill Brothers and returned to Santa Cruz Club of Cavellosim.

Personal life
Vaz has a brother, Charlton, who also played at Dempo.

Professional statistics

References

1990 births
Living people
People from Goa
Indian footballers
Association football midfielders
Dempo SC players
Churchill Brothers FC Goa players
I-League players
Goa Professional League players
Footballers from Goa
Indian men's futsal players
Futsal coaches